Jamie Keeton (born July 9, 1968) is an American man with a medical condition that enables objects to stick to his skin by suction. Nicknamed "Canhead", he has made a career from demonstrating his abilities, and  holds the Guinness World Record for the most drink cans attached by air suction to the head.

Background
Jamie Keeton was born on July 9, 1968. Originally from Pensacola, Florida, he lived in Chicago for about 20 years and later moved to Kenosha, Wisconsin. According to Keeton, he began to notice that his toys and other objects stuck to his body at the age of seven. He discovered the extent of his skin's ability at a baseball game, when he realized that a can from which he was drinking inadvertently became stuck to his shaved head. 

Keeton's doctor determined that his skin takes in more oxygen than average, which causes his oxygen level to be 23 percent higher than average and allows non-porous objects to stick to his skin through air suction. The skin condition is unnamed, and in 2018 Keeton claimed to be one of four people in the world to be affected by it.

Career
Keeton has built a career out of his skin condition, such as by advertising products and businesses or acting as a master of ceremonies at various events, at which he can earn "10 to 20 thousand dollars a weekend". He has appeared on television shows to demonstrate his talent, including The Ellen DeGeneres Show and The Late Late Show with James Corden. In 2016, he appeared on Nature's Weirdest Events, a nature documentary series produced by the BBC, in which Keeton was referred to as a "human–octopus hybrid guy". In 2020 he appeared on the Go-Big Show on TBS, a television show featuring extreme talents.

In 2022, Keeton was awarded the Guinness World Record for the "most drink cans placed on the head using air suction", attaching ten cans to his head for at least five seconds. He had previously set the record with eight cans in 2016, but lost it in 2019.

References

External links

1968 births
Living people
Guinness World Records
People from Chicago
People from Kenosha, Wisconsin
People from Pensacola, Florida